Soava Gallone, née Stanisława Winawerówna (1880 – 30 May 1957) was a Polish and later Italian film actress who appeared in early Italian cinema. She appeared in more than 40 films between 1913 and 1931. She was the wife of film director Carmine Gallone. Her mother was the Polish writer Regina Winawer. Her younger brother Józef Bruno Winawer (known in Italy by the stage name Giuseppe Varni) was also an actor.

Selected filmography
 Il bacio di Cirano (1913)
 Senza colpa! (1915)
 Sotto le tombe (1915)
 Avatar (1916)
 La storia di un peccato (1918)
 A Doll Wife (1919)
 On with the Motley (1920)
 Nemesis (1920)
 Through the Shadows (1923)
 The Faces of Love (1924)
 The Fiery Cavalcade (1925)
 The Doctor's Secret (1931)

References

External links
 
 

1880 births
1957 deaths
Actresses from Warsaw
Polish film actresses
Polish silent film actresses
Italian film actresses
Italian silent film actresses
Emigrants from the Russian Empire to Italy
Polish emigrants to Italy
20th-century Italian actresses
20th-century Polish actresses